The Joel M. Pruyn Block is located in Lodi, Wisconsin, United States. It was added to the National Register of Historic Places in 2008.

History
The building originally served as a grocery store. Later, it became a butcher shop. Since 1923, The Lodi Enterprise, the local newspaper, has been published out of the building.

References

Buildings and structures in Columbia County, Wisconsin
Commercial buildings completed in 1881
Commercial buildings on the National Register of Historic Places in Wisconsin
Lodi, Wisconsin
National Register of Historic Places in Columbia County, Wisconsin
1881 establishments in Wisconsin